Junjun may refer to:

JunJun, a character from the Sailor Moon franchise
Junjun (singer) (born 1988), former member of the all-girl J-pop group Morning Musume
Hilario Davide III (born 1964), Filipino politician
Jejomar Binay Jr. (born 1977), Filipino politician

See also
Junjung, a West African drum